Joel Chimelis (born July 27, 1967) is a minor league baseball hitting coach for the Syracuse Mets and a former professional baseball infielder. Although he never played in Major League Baseball, he briefly was called up to the major league roster of the San Francisco Giants in June 1995. He also played one season in the CPBL in 1997, and one season in the Korea Baseball Organization in 1998. In all, Chimelis played in baseball's minor leagues for 13 years.

Early life and education
A native of Puerto Rico, Chimelis grew up in Brooklyn, New York. He graduated from Eastern District High School in Brooklyn. He attended Howard College in Big Spring, Texas and also attended the University of Texas, where he played baseball on the 1988 squad and was named to the 1988 NCAA Central Region team.

Early career
In early June 1988, Chimelis was drafted as a shortstop by the Oakland Athletics in the 11th round of the major league draft and sent to their Southern Oregon A's rookie-league minor league team in Medford, Oregon for the remainder of the 1988 season.

Chimelis then played for the minor league Shreveport Captains, a Double-A minor league team in the San Francisco Giants organization, in 1992, 1993, and 1994, and also played for the Giants' Triple-A minor league team, the Phoenix Firebirds, in 1992 and 1993.

Replacement player controversy
While major league players were on strike during spring training in 1995, Chimelis agreed to take the field as part of the San Francisco Giants' replacement team. Once the strike ended, Chimelis headed to the Giants' Triple-A Phoenix minor league club.

On June 4, 1995, the Giants called up Chimelis to their major league roster to replace the injured infielder Matt Williams, who had broken a bone in his foot. Although several other major league teams had called up former replacement players, the Giants hadn't done so yet, and its players grumbled about the idea of welcoming a strikebreaker on the team. As a result, Chimelis, who had been hitting .294 at Phoenix, immediately was treated as an outcast by Giants players, who held a players-only meeting at which they excluded Chimelis. "I never associated with a replacement player, and I wasn't about to now", Giants first baseman Mark Carreon told the San Francisco Chronicle in an article that appeared on June 6, 1995. "A lot of us for eight months made sacrifices. I'm sure he's a great guy (Chimelis), but we stood for something."

After a threat of player revolt, the Giants sent Chimelis back down to the minor leagues just two days later, on June 6, 1995, without Chimelis ever having appeared in a major league game. "They told me they would get me a flight out the next morning", Chimelis told the Daily Press (Virginia) in an article that was published on August 13, 1996. "But I said, 'The hell with that. I'll go right now.' Why stay when you aren't happy and you aren't wanted? It's hard not to be angry, but there are two ways you can react to that anger. You can cry about it and dig yourself a hole, or you can build from it. All I did was try to support my family. Now I'm just trying to play baseball and do my job." Chimelis was never called back up to the major leagues again, and finished his season in Phoenix. He was released by the Giants during the first week of September in 1995.

Later career
In 1996, Chimelis started the season with the Guerreros de Oaxaca in the Mexican League. On July 26, 1996, he was signed by the Norfolk Tides, the Triple-A minor league club for the New York Mets, and spent the balance of the season there. In 1997, Chimelis played for the Brother Elephants of CPBL in Taiwan. In 1998, Chimelis played for the Hanwha Eagles in South Korea.

Chimelis played in the Mexican League in 2000, for what the Tecolotes de los Dos Laredos (now the Tecolotes de Nuevo Laredo). In 2001, Chimelis played in the Mexican League and for the Quebec Capitales in the independent Northern League. He played a stint in Puerto Rico during the winter of 2002, then returned to the Tecolotes later that year, but retired in 2003.

Coaching career
In 2004 and 2005, Chimelis was the hitting coach for the Single-A Savannah Sand Gnats minor league team in the Washington Nationals organization.

In January 2006, the Houston Astros announced that Chimelis would become the hitting coach for the Tri-City ValleyCats, who play a short season in the New York–Penn League. Chimelis continued in that role through the 2010 season.

In 2011, Chimelis served as the hitting coach for the Astros' Class A Lexington Legends team.  In 2012, Chimelis served as the hitting coach for the Astros' Class AA Corpus Christi Hooks team., and then served as the hitting coach for the Quad Cities River Bandits, the Astros' low-A affiliate in the Midwest League. Chimelis was the hitting coach for the Las Vegas 51s of the New York Mets organization for the 2018 season and continued his role with the Mets’ AAA team when it moved to Syracuse in 2019.

References

External links

Career statistics and player information from Korea Baseball Organization

1967 births
Living people
American expatriate baseball players in Canada
American expatriate baseball players in Mexico
American expatriate baseball players in South Korea
American expatriate baseball players in Taiwan
Baseball coaches from New York (state)
Brother Elephants players
Guerreros de Oaxaca players
Hanwha Eagles players
Huntsville Stars players
KBO League infielders
Mexican League baseball first basemen
Mexican League baseball left fielders
Mexican League baseball second basemen
Minor league baseball coaches
Modesto A's players
Norfolk Tides players
Phoenix Firebirds players
Québec Capitales players
Reno Silver Sox players
Southern Oregon A's players
San Jose Giants players
Shreveport Captains players
Sportspeople from Brooklyn
Baseball players from New York City
Tecolotes de los Dos Laredos players